Doma or DOMA may refer to:

Places 
 Domah, a mandal in Ranga Reddy district, Andhra Pradesh, India
 Doma, Nigeria, a local government in Nasarawa State, Nigeria
 Duma, Nablus, a Palestinian town in the West Bank
 Doma Cathedral, a cathedral in Riga, Latvia

Other uses 
 Defense of Marriage Act (DOMA), a 1996 American federal law
 3,4-Dihydroxymandelic acid, a metabolite of norepinephrine
 Dom people, an ethnic group in the Middle East
 Vadoma, an ethnic group of Zimbabwe
 Abron language or Doma
 TV Doma in Slovakia
 Doma TV in Croatia
 Hyphaene or Doma, genus of palms
 Doma, the lower earthen floor of a Japanese minka

See also 
 Dom (disambiguation)
 Dome (disambiguation)